The 1915 South Dakota Coyotes football team represented the University of South Dakota during the 1915 college football season. In Ion Cortright's second and final season at South Dakota, the Coyotes compiled a 4–2–2 record and outscored their opponents 86 to 39, not allowing a single point in their final four contests.

Schedule

References

South Dakota
South Dakota Coyotes football seasons
South Dakota Coyotes football